Martin Chuzzlewit is a 1994 TV serial produced by the BBC, based on the 1844 novel by Charles Dickens, with a screenplay by David Lodge and directed by Pedr James. The music was composed by Geoffrey Burgon.

Episode 1 was originally aired in an 85-minute time slot, while the remaining 5 episodes were 60 minutes in length. It was originally broadcast on BBC2 from 7 November to 12 December 1994. In the U.S., the series aired as 5 episodes on PBS's Masterpiece Theatre in 1995.

Plot summary
Elderly, wealthy Martin Chuzzlewit is constantly hounded by his money-grubbing relations, a fact that depresses and embitters him. He adopts an orphan young woman, Mary Graham, whom he wants as a companion in his old age; she will be paid an annual allowance but will not benefit from his death. However, Martin disowns his grandson, also called Martin, after he falls in love with Mary. Young Martin decides to pursue a career as an architect, studying with hypocritical, dishonest architect Seth Pecksniff, who lives with his two daughters Charity and Mercy and good, kind-hearted apprentice Tom Pinch, whom he is exploiting as a servant. Martin forms a close friendship with Tom, but after he discovers Pecksniff's true character, he leaves for America, in the company of Mark Tapley (ostler of the local inn), to seek his fortune.

Pecksniff, who is a cousin of the Chuzzlewits, insinuates himself into Old Martin's company, taking him in as a guest, hoping for a generous legacy on the event of Martin's death. He also makes sexual advances towards Mary; she, who has also formed a special friendship with Tom, tells him of this and he, shocked, leaves the Pecksniff household for London, setting up home with his sister Ruth. Jonas Chuzzlewit, son of old Martin's estranged brother Anthony, marries Mercy Pecksniff – despite being twice her age and having previously shown more interest in Charity – and mistreats her. He also finds himself drawn into a fraudulent insurance scheme masterminded by Tigg Montague, and concocts a murderous plot in order to extricate himself from this. Meanwhile, Mr Chuffey, Anthony's senile clerk, goes into shock in the event of Anthony's sudden death and sleazy private nurse Sarah Gamp is hired to care for him.

Main cast
 Paul Scofield as Old Martin Chuzzlewit/Anthony Chuzzlewit
 Pete Postlethwaite as Tigg Montague/Montague Tigg
 Tom Wilkinson as Seth Pecksniff
 Keith Allen as Jonas Chuzzlewit
 Philip Franks as Tom Pinch
 Elizabeth Spriggs as Sarah Gamp
 John Mills as Mr Chuffey
 Julia Sawalha as Mercy Pecksniff
 Emma Chambers as Charity Pecksniff
 Steve Nicolson as Mark Tapley
 Pauline Turner as Mary Graham
 Ben Walden as Young Martin Chuzzlewit
 Lynda Bellingham as Mrs Lupin
 Maggie Steed as Mrs Todgers
 David Bradley as David Crimple
 Joan Sims as Betsey Prig
 Sam Kelly as Mr Mould
 Peter Wingfield as John Westlock
 Graham Stark as Mr Nadget

Critical reception
"The British cast is exemplary." observed The New York Times; while Variety opined "Would-be adaptors, screenwriters and producers would profit by a study of Lodge's work on "Chuzzlewit". The adaptation's characters and plotline stick to Dickens' intentions, despite omis-sions, and the five-part dramatization does even more: It catches the original's blithe spirit."

References

External links

BBC television dramas
1990s British drama television series
1994 British television series debuts
1994 British television series endings
Works by David Lodge
Television shows based on works by Charles Dickens
1990s British television miniseries
Television series set in the 19th century
BBC Birmingham productions
English-language television shows